Castle Rock Regional Recreation Area is a  regional park of the East Bay Regional Park District. It is located in Contra Costa County, in the East Bay region of northern California.

Geography
The park lies in a scenic sandstone canyon in the Diablo Foothills of the northern Diablo Range, west of Mount Diablo and Mount Diablo State Park. The closest city is Walnut Creek to the north. 

Castle Rock Regional Recreation Area is bordered by: Diablo Foothills Regional Park on the west, and Shell Ridge Open Space to the north. Together, these three parks provide  of parkland for visitors to enjoy.

See also

References

External links
  East Bay Regional Parks.org: official Castle Rock Regional Recreation Area website

East Bay Regional Park District
Parks in Contra Costa County, California
Diablo Range